Úbislavice is a municipality and village in Jičín District in the Hradec Králové Region of the Czech Republic. It has about 500 inhabitants.

Administrative parts
Villages of Česká Proseč, Chloumek, Stav, Štěpanice and Zboží are administrative parts of Úbislavice.

Notable people
Jan Gebauer (1838–1907), Czech studies expert
Věra Janoušková (1922–2010), sculptor and graphic artist

References

Villages in Jičín District